Roy Joseph Maurice Gagnon (January 6, 1913 – June 29, 2000) was an American football guard who played one season with the Detroit Lions of the National Football League. He played college football at the University of Oregon and attended DeLaSalle High School in Minneapolis, Minnesota.

References

External links
Just Sports Stats

1913 births
2000 deaths
Players of American football from Minneapolis
American football guards
Oregon Ducks football players
Detroit Lions players
DeLaSalle High School (Minneapolis) alumni